Ivan Babić may refer to:

 Ivan Babić (footballer, born 1981), Serbian football player
 Ivan Babić (footballer, born 1984), Croatian footballer
 Ivan Babić (officer) (1904–1982), Croatian soldier and lieutenant-colonel

See also

 Babić